Devario acuticephala is a small danionin from Manipur in India. It grows to approximately 1.5 inches and has a black line along its length and an area of red below the black line posterior to the dorsal.  They are mostly found in hill streams and ponds.

References

External links
 Devario acuticephala

Devario
Fish described in 1921